Scorpaenopsis cotticeps, the sculpin scorpionfish, is a species of venomous marine ray-finned fish belonging to the family Scorpaenidae, the scorpionfishes. This species is found in theIndo-West Pacific.

Size

References

cotticeps
Taxa named by Henry Weed Fowler
Fish described in 1938